The Yakovlev Yak-54 is a 1990s Russian aerobatic and sports competition aircraft designed by the Yakovlev Aircraft Corporation.

Design and development
Part of a new generation of acrobatic aircraft from the Yakovlev design bureau which has a long line of aircraft designs since 1937 with the UT-2/AIR-10, the Yak-54 is a development of the single-seat Yak-55M, designed by Chief Constructor Dmitry Drach and Lead Engineer Vladimir Popov. It first flew 23 December 1993.

It was produced by Saratov Aviation Facility in cooperation with JSV "Gorky U-2" up to 2005, when the production moved to the Arsenyev Aviation Company "Progress" facility in Arsenyev.

Specifications (Yak-54)

See also

References

External links
  

1990s Soviet and Russian sport aircraft
Yak-054
Mid-wing aircraft
Single-engined tractor aircraft
Aircraft first flown in 1993